Carl of Nericia ; Swedish Hertig Karl av Närke - may refer to:

Carl IX, King of Sweden 1604–1611, also Duke of Sudermania
Carl Philip, Prince of Sweden 1601, also Duke of Sudermania